Jeff Smith or Jeffrey Smith may refer to:

In sports

American football
Jeff Smith (offensive lineman) (born 1973), American football player
Jeff Smith (running back) (born 1962), retired running back
Jeff Smith (wide receiver, born 1962), American player of gridiron football
Jeff Smith (wide receiver, born 1997), American football player

Combat sports
Jeff Smith (boxer) (1891–1962), American boxer
Jeff Smith (born 1948), American professional wrestling manager best known as Izzy Slapawitz
Jeff Smith (martial arts) (born 1963), American martial artist

Other sports
Jeff Smith (motorcyclist) (born 1934), former world champion motocross racer
Jeff Smith (footballer, born 1935), English football full back (Lincoln City)
Jeff Smith (racing driver) (born 1966), British racing car driver and businessman
Jeff Smith (baseball) (born 1974), coach in the Minnesota Twins' organization
Jeff Smith (darts player) (born 1975), Canadian darts player
Jeff Smith (footballer, born 1980), English football defender/midfielder (Port Vale, Carlisle United and Darlington)

In politics and government
Jeff Smith (British politician) (born 1963), MP for Manchester Withington 2015-
Jeff Smith (Mississippi politician) (born 1949), Republican (formerly Democratic) legislator
Jeff Smith (Wisconsin politician) (born 1955), Wisconsin legislator
Jeff Smith (Iowa politician) (born 1967), Iowa State Representative
Jeff Smith (Missouri politician) (born 1973), former State Senator, convicted of crimes related to federal election law violations

Other
Jeff Smith (cartoonist) (born 1960), creator of the comic book Bone
Jeff Smith, comedy musician from duo Raymond and Scum
Jeff Smith (chef) (1939–2004), host of The Frugal Gourmet TV program
Jefferson "Jeff" Smith, the protagonist in the 1939 film Mr. Smith Goes to Washington
Jeffrey H. Smith, former professor of mathematics at Purdue University, Indiana
Jeffrey M. Smith (born 1958), journalist, author and documentary filmmaker
Jeffrey W. Smith, biologist at the Burnham Institute
Jeffrey Chipps Smith, American art historian
Jeffrey Christopher Smith, American entrepreneur, co-founder and CEO of Smule
Jeffrey G. Smith (1921–2021), U.S. Army general
Jeff Smith (hedge fund manager), American hedge fund manager
R. Jeffrey Smith, American journalist
Jeffrey Smith, Washington, D.C. police officer involved in the 2021 storming of the U.S Capitol Building

See also
Geoff Smith (disambiguation)
Geoffrey Smith (disambiguation)
Jefferson Smith (disambiguation)